Artena submira is a species of moth of the family Erebidae first described by Francis Walker in 1858. It is found in India.

References

Catocalinae
Moths described in 1858
Moths of Asia